Phyllonorycter manzanita is a moth of the family Gracillariidae. It is known from California, United States.

The larvae feed on Arctostaphylos glauca and Arctostaphylos manzanita. They mine the leaves of their host plant. The mine has the form of a grayish blotch mine, with the upper epidermis loosened and elevated, but at no stage wrinkled. This leads to a somewhat inflated mine in which most of the parenchyma is consumed.

References

External links
mothphotographersgroup

manzanita
Moths of North America
Moths described in 1925